The Douglas BTD Destroyer is an American dive/torpedo bomber developed for the United States Navy during World War II. A small number had been delivered before the end of the war, but none saw combat.

Development

On 20 June 1941, the United States Navy placed an order with the Douglas Aircraft Company for two prototypes of a new two-seat dive bomber to replace both the Douglas SBD Dauntless and the new Curtiss SB2C Helldiver, designated XSB2D-1. The resulting aircraft, designed by a team led by Ed Heinemann, was a large single-engined mid-winged monoplane. It had a laminar flow gull-wing, and unusually for a carrier-based aircraft of the time, a tricycle undercarriage. It was fitted with a bomb bay and underwing racks for up to 4,200 lb (1,900 kg) of bombs or one torpedo (typically the Mark 13), while defensive armament consisted of two wing-mounted 20 mm (0.79 in) cannon and two remote-controlled turrets, each with two .50 in (12.7 mm) machine guns.

The prototype first flew on 8 April 1943, demonstrating good performance, being faster than the Dauntless and capable of carrying more bombload, but it was heavier and more complex. The U.S. Navy had made a request for a new torpedo bomber developed from the XSB2D-1. Douglas reworked the XSB2D-1 by removing the turrets and second crewman, while adding more fuel and armor, while wing racks could carry not just one but two torpedoes, producing the BTD-1 Destroyer. The orders for the SB2D-1 were converted to the BTD-1, with the first BTD-1 flying on 5 March 1944. The BTD-1 was heavier than the XS2BD-1 and had poorer performance. Ed Heinemann asked for cancelling of the BTD-1.

Operational history
The first production BTD-1s were completed in June 1944. By the time Japan surrendered in August 1945, only 28 aircraft had been delivered, and production was cancelled due to performance, along with other aircraft types that had been designed from the start as single-seaters, such as the Martin AM Mauler. None saw combat action. In any event, Heinemann and his team were already working on developing the single-seat BT2D that became the Douglas A-1 Skyraider.

Variants

XSB2D-1
Prototype two seat torpedo/dive bomber. Two built.
SB2D-1
Proposed production version of XSB2D-1. 358 ordered, but order converted to BTD-1 before any completed
BTD-1
Single seat variant. 26 built.
XBTD-2
Prototypes with mixed propulsion, the additional Westinghouse 19B turbojet in rear fuselage giving 1,500 lbf (6.7 kN) thrust did not sufficiently improve performance. First flight May 1944.  Two built.

Operators

United States Navy

Surviving aircraft

BTD-1 Destroyer, Bureau Number 04959, was under restoration for display at the Wings of Eagles Discovery Center, Elmira-Corning Regional Airport, Elmira, New York. This aircraft had long been in the Florence Air & Missile Museum collection until the museum's closing in 1997. In September 2015 the aircraft was relocated to the Hixson Flight Museum in Rome, Georgia, where it is undergoing restoration.

Specifications (BTD-1)

See also

References

Notes

Bibliography

External links

  A link to the official USN BuAer ACP (Airplane Characteristics and Performance) sheet from USN archives on the Douglas BTD-1 Destroyer.
  A three-view plan of the BTD-1 Destroyer.

BTD Destroyer
1940s United States bomber aircraft
Carrier-based aircraft
Single-engined tractor aircraft
World War II dive bombers of the United States
World War II torpedo bombers of the United States
Mid-wing aircraft
Aircraft first flown in 1943
Inverted gull-wing aircraft